KBFS (1450 AM) is a radio station broadcasting a News Talk Information format. Licensed to Belle Fourche, South Dakota, United States, the station serves the Rapid City area. The station is currently owned by Ultimate Caps, Inc. and features programming from Dial Global, Glenn Beck, Northern Ag Network, Denver Broncos, Colorado Rockies, Colorado Avalanche, Denver Nuggets and NASCAR.

References

External links
FCC History Cards for KBFS

BFS
News and talk radio stations in the United States
Radio stations established in 1959
1959 establishments in South Dakota